The 49ers–Cowboys rivalry is a National Football League (NFL) rivalry between the San Francisco 49ers and the Dallas Cowboys. The Cowboys and 49ers split the series 19–19–1. It is one of the great inter-division rivalry games in the NFL. The two teams do not play every year; instead, they play once every three years due to the NFL's rotating division schedules, or if the two teams finish in the same place in their respective divisions, they would play the ensuing season. Sports Illustrated ranked it as the eighth best rivalry while the NFL Top 10 ranked this rivalry to be the tenth best in the NFL. In 2020, CBS ranked it as the No. 1 NFL rivalry of the 1990s. The rivalry was also the subject of two 2015 episodes of NFL Network's The Timeline entitled "A Tale of Two Cities" with actors Sam Elliott (Cowboys) and Jeremy Renner (49ers) as narrators.

History
The rivalry between the Cowboys and 49ers has been going on since the 1970s, including nine postseason games. The Cowboys defeated the 49ers in the 1970 and 1971 NFC Championship games, and again in the 1972 Divisional Playoff Game. The 1981 NFC Championship Game in San Francisco, which saw the 49ers' Joe Montana complete a game-winning pass to Dwight Clark in the final minute (now known as The Catch) is one of the most famous games in NFL history.

The rivalry became even more intense from 1992 to 1994 when the two teams faced each other in the NFC Championship Game during all three seasons. Dallas won the first two match-ups while San Francisco won the third, and in each of these pivotal match-ups, the game's victor went on to win the Super Bowl. With the Cowboys winning the Super Bowl following the 1995 season, from 1992 to 1995, either the Cowboys or the 49ers were Super Bowl champions, giving both teams five each – which, at the time, was tied for the most by any NFL team (currently, both teams are tied for third behind the Pittsburgh Steelers and the New England Patriots with six each).

The rivalry went cold for many years due to the two teams’ inability to make the postseason in the same year after  and until , when both teams made the playoffs and were matched against each other in the Wild Card Round in Dallas. The 49ers won that game 23–17. The two teams would meet each other in the 2022 playoff divisional round, which saw the 49ers take a 19-12 win, making the all-time series tied 19-19-1.

Players who have won championships with both teams include defensive end Charles Haley, linebacker Ken Norton Jr. and cornerback Deion Sanders.

As of the end of the 2022 season, the 49ers are one of two NFC teams that the Cowboys do not have a winning record against, along with the Green Bay Packers.

Game results

|-
| 
| style="| 49ers  26–14
| Cotton Bowl
| 49ers  1–0
| Cowboys' inaugural season. This loss was the Cowboys' ninth of ten straight losses to start the season.
|-
| 
| style="| 49ers   31–24
| Kezar Stadium
| 49ers  2–0
|
|-
| 
| style="| Cowboys   39–31
| Cotton Bowl
| 49ers  2–1
| 
|-
| 
| style="| 49ers  24–16
| Kezar Stadium
| 49ers  3–1
|
|-
| 
|  Tie  24–24
| Cotton Bowl
| 49ers  3–1–1
| Game played on Thanksgiving Day. Only meeting to end in a tie to date. First game in this series for former Cowboys defensive back and assistant coach Dick Nolan as 49ers head coach.
|-
|-

|-
! 1970 playoffs
! style="| Cowboys   17–10
! Kezar Stadium
! 49ers  3–2–1
! NFC Championship Game. First postseason meeting in the series. Last meeting in Kezar Stadium. Cowboys lose Super Bowl V.
|- style="background:#f0f0f0"
! 1971 playoffs
! style="| Cowboys   14–3
! Texas Stadium
! Tie  3–3–1
! Second straight NFC Championship Game meeting. First start in series for Roger Staubach. First meeting in Texas Stadium. Cowboys win Super Bowl VI.
|-
| 
| style="| 49ers  31–10
| Texas Stadium
| 49ers  4–3–1
| 
|-
! 1972 playoffs
! style="| Cowboys   30–28
! Candlestick Park
! Tie  4–4–1
! NFC Divisional playoffs. First meeting at Candlestick Park. With Roger Staubach (who had been injured for much of the season) coming off the bench to replace an ineffective Craig Morton; Cowboys overcome 21–3 deficit and a 28–13 deficit in the fourth quarter to win. Last 49ers post-season game until 1981.
|-
| 
| style="| Cowboys  20–14
| Texas Stadium
| Cowboys  5–4–1
| Cowboys take first lead in the series.
|-
| 
| style="| Cowboys  42–35
| Candlestick Park
| Cowboys  6–4–1
| First ever Monday Night Football matchup between the two teams; Cowboys win Super Bowl XII.
|-
| 
| style="| Cowboys  21–13
| Candlestick Park
| Cowboys  7–4–1
| Last start in the series for Roger Staubach.
|-
|-

|-
| 
| style="| Cowboys  59–14
| Texas Stadium
| Cowboys  8–4–1
| Last Cowboys victory in this series until the 1992 NFC Championship Game.
|-
| 
| style="| 49ers   45–14
| Candlestick Park
| Cowboys  8–5–1
| First start in the series for Joe Montana. This game also marked the first game as a 49er for defensive end Fred Dean after Dean was acquired in a trade with the San Diego Chargers.
|-
! 1981 playoffs
! style="| 49ers  28–27
! Candlestick Park
! Cowboys  8–6–1
! NFC Championship Game. First postseason win for the 49ers over the Cowboys. Wide receiver Dwight Clark makes a leaping catch in the back of the end zone on a pass from Joe Montana with 51 seconds left, best referred to as "The Catch". 49ers win Super Bowl XVI.
|-
| 
| style="| 49ers  42–17
| Candlestick Park
| Cowboys  8–7–1
| 
|-
| 
| style="| 49ers  31–16
| Candlestick Park
| Tie  8–8–1
| The 49er victory allowed them to clinch the final NFC wild-card spot that season. 
|-
| 
| style="| 49ers  31–14
| Texas Stadium
| 49ers  9–8–1
| 49ers win Super Bowl XXIV. 49ers take first series lead since 1972.
|-
|-

|-
| 
| style="| 49ers  24–6
| Texas Stadium
| 49ers  10–8–1
| First start in series for Troy Aikman. Last start in series for Joe Montana.
|-
! 1992 playoffs
! style="| Cowboys  30–20
! Candlestick Park
! 49ers  10–9–1
! NFC Championship Game. Cowboys win Super Bowl XXVII. After the game, Cowboys' head coach Jimmy Johnson was caught saying "How Bout Them Cowboys" in their postgame locker room.
|-
| 
| style="| Cowboys  26–17
| Texas Stadium
| Tie  10–10–1
| 
|-
! 1993 playoffs
! style="| Cowboys  38–21
! Texas Stadium
! Cowboys  11–10–1
! Second straight NFC Championship Game meeting. Cowboys win Super Bowl XXVIII. Troy Aikman was knocked out of the game with a concussion after the knee of rookie 49er defensive tackle Dana Stubblefield struck his head.
|-
| 
| style="| 49ers  21–14
| Candlestick Park
| Tie  11–11–1
| 
|-
! 1994 playoffs
! style="| 49ers  38–28
! Candlestick Park
! 49ers  12–11–1
! Third straight NFC Championship Game meeting. 49ers win Super Bowl XXIX.
|-
| 
| style="| 49ers  38–20
| Texas Stadium
| 49ers  13–11–1
| Cowboys win Super Bowl XXX.
|-
| 
| style="| Cowboys  20–17(OT)
| 3Com Park
| 49ers  13–12–1
| First meeting between the two teams to go into overtime.
|-
| 
| style="| 49ers  17–10
| 3Com Park
| 49ers  14–12–1
| Last start in the series for Steve Young. 
|-

|-
| 
| style="| 49ers  41–24
| Texas Stadium
| 49ers  15–12–1
| Last start in the series for Troy Aikman. This game was remembered for 49ers wide receiver (and future Cowboy) Terrell Owens spiking the ball on the Cowboys star at midfield following a touchdown and subsequently being hit by Cowboys safety George Teague.
|-
| 
| style="| Cowboys  27–21
| Texas Stadium
| 49ers  15–13–1
| 
|-
| 
| style="| 49ers  31–27
| Texas Stadium
| 49ers  16–13–1
| 
|-
| 
| style="| Cowboys  34–31
| Monster Park
| 49ers  16–14–1
| 
|-
| 
| style="| Cowboys  35–22
| Texas Stadium
| 49ers  16–15–1
| Last meeting in Texas Stadium.
|-

|-
| 
| style="| Cowboys  27–24 (OT)
| Candlestick Park
| Tie  16–16–1
| Last meeting in Candlestick Park.
|-
| 
| style="| 49ers  28–17
| AT&T Stadium
| 49ers  17–16–1
| First meeting at AT&T Stadium.
|-
| 
| style="| Cowboys  24–17
| Levi's Stadium
| Tie  17–17–1
| First meeting at Levi's Stadium.
|-
| 
| style="| Cowboys  40–10
| Levi's Stadium
| Cowboys  18–17–1
| Cowboys take first lead in the series since winning the 1993 NFC Championship Game.
|-

|-
| 
| style="| Cowboys  41–33
| AT&T Stadium
| Cowboys  19–17–1
| Limited fans in attendance due to ongoing COVID-19 pandemic. 49ers were eliminated from postseason contention with this loss, coupled with a win by the Cardinals.
|-
! 2021 playoffs
! style="| 49ers   23–17 
! AT&T Stadium
! Cowboys  19–18–1
! NFC Wild Card playoffs. First playoff meeting since 1994.
|-
! 2022 playoffs
! style="| 49ers   19–12 
! Levi's Stadium
! Tie  19–19–1
! NFC Divisional playoffs. Ninth postseason meeting, ties NFL record.
|-
| 
| 
| Levi's Stadium
| 
| 
|-

|-
| Regular season
| style="|
| Tie 7–7
| 49ers 8–7–1
| 
|-
| Postseason
| style="|
| Tie 3–3
| Cowboys 2–1
| NFC Wild Card Round: 2021NFC Divisional Round: 1972, 2022NFC Championship Game: 1970, 1971, 1981, 1992, 1993, 1994.
|-
| Regular and postseason 
| Tie 19–19–1
| Tie 10–10
| Tie 9–9–1
| 
|-

See also
California–Texas rivalry
49ers–Rams rivalry
Cowboys–Rams rivalry

References

San Francisco 49ers
Dallas Cowboys
National Football League rivalries
Dallas Cowboys rivalries
San Francisco 49ers rivalries